Coronation Street Live may refer to:

"Coronation Street Live" (2000 episode), live episode of Coronation Street broadcast on 
"Coronation Street Live" (2010 episode), live episode of Coronation Street broadcast on 
"Coronation Street Live" (2015 episode), live episode of Coronation Street broadcast on 

See also
Episode 1 (Coronation Street), the series' first episode, also broadcast live, on 9 December 1960